Valeria or Valéria is a female given name dating back to the Latin verb valere, meaning strong, brave and healthy "to be strong".

List of people with the given name Valeria

Religion
Valeria of Milan, or Saint Valeria, Christian martyr (1st or 2nd century)
Valeria, a Christian saint martyred with Anesius

Roman history
Valeria (wife of Sulla), the fourth wife of Roman dictator Lucius Cornelius Sulla
Valeria Maximilla, Roman empress as the wife of Emperor Maxentius
Valeria Messalina, Roman empress as the third wife of Emperor Claudius

Arts and entertainment
Valeriya, Russian pop star
Valeria Bertuccelli, Argentine film and television actress
Valeria Cavalli, Italian actress
Valeria Ciangottini, Italian actress
Valeria Diaz, Argentine actress and singer
Valeria Gastaldi, Argentine singer
Valeria Golino, Italian-Greek film and television actress
Valeria Kozlova, Russian musician also known as Lera Kozlova
Valeria Marini, Italian model, actress, showgirl and fashion designer
Valeria Mazza, Argentine supermodel and businesswoman
Valeria Morales, Puerto Rican singer and actress
Valeria Moriconi, Italian actress
Valeria Solarino, Italian actress
Valeria Bruni Tedeschi, Italian-French actress
Valeria Lukyanova, Ukrainian model, best known as Human Barbie.

Business 
Valeria Lipczynski (1846–1930), American businesswoman

Military, space, and government
Valeria Alessandrini (born 1975), Italian politician
Valeriya Gnarovskaya, Soviet military hero
Valeria Valente (born 1976), Italian politician and lawyer

Sports
Valeriya Gansvind (born 1965), Estonian chess player
Valeria Kleiner, German football player
Valeria Lyulyaeva, Russian rower
Valeria Solovieva, professional Russian tennis player
Valeria Spälty, Swiss curler
Valeria Starygina, Russian ice dancer
Valeria Zenkova, Russian ice dancer

Fictional characters
Valeria, a character in Coriolanus by William Shakespeare
Valeria (Conan the Barbarian), character in the stories and films concerning Conan the Barbarian
Valeria Meghan Von Doom (née Richards), a fictional character in the Marvel Universe
Valeria Watt, a character in Carry On Screaming! played by Fenella Fielding
Valeria, a deserting soldier in the first Suikoden game
Valeria: a fictional character in the Mexican telenovela El Cuerpo del Deseo
Valeria: a fictional detective in the novel The Law and the Lady
Valeria Ferrer, a character in the telenovela Carrusel
Valeria Ferriz, a character in Elisabet Benavent's book series  Valeria

See also
Valeriya, Russian singer

 Valeria (disambiguation)
 Valerie (given name)

 Valery (name)
 Valeriu (given name)
 Valerius (name)
 Valerian (name)
 Valeriano (name)
 Valerianus (disambiguation)

 Valer (disambiguation)
 Valera (disambiguation)
 Valérien (disambiguation)

 
 

Ancient Roman names
Greek feminine given names
Italian feminine given names
Russian feminine given names
Ukrainian feminine given names
Bulgarian feminine given names
Spanish feminine given names
Norwegian feminine given names
Portuguese feminine given names
Romanian feminine given names
Polish feminine given names
Czech feminine given names
Slovak feminine given names
Serbian feminine given names
Slovene feminine given names
Croatian feminine given names